1993 RP might be a trans-Neptunian object, perhaps  in diameter, from the Kuiper belt in the outermost Solar System. However, the object has only a 2-day observation arc, making the data insufficient to provide virtually any idea of its true orbit. It was first observed on 15 September 1993, by astronomers at the Mauna Kea Observatory, one night after  and the night before .

On the discovery date of 15 September 1993 the object was estimated to have been  from Earth with an uncertainty in the object's distance of ±200 billion km. Johnston's website generically lists it as a plutino, like Pluto, which are objects that stay in a 2:3 orbital resonance with Neptune.

Briefly observed objects like 1993 RP generally have many possible orbits that fit the very small dataset. 1993 RP could be a TNO/centaur or a much closer main belt asteroid 100 times smaller in diameter. For example,  was once thought to be a potential dwarf planet, but is now known to be a small main belt asteroid.

, the uncertainty in the object's distance from the Sun is ±.

See also 
 1995 GJ

References

External links 
 List of Transneptunian Objects, Minor Planet Center
 

Kuiper belt objects
Minor planet object articles (unnumbered)
Lost minor planets
19930915